Fin Garden ( Bagh-e Fin) located in Kashan, Iran, is a historical Persian garden. It contains Kashan's Fin Bath, where Amir Kabir, the Qajarid chancellor, was murdered by an assassin sent by King Nasereddin Shah in 1852. Completed in 1590, the Fin Garden is the oldest extant garden in Iran.

History
The origins of the garden may be anterior to the Safavid period; some sources indicate that the garden has been relocated from another place, but no clear picture of it has been found.

The settlements of the garden in its present form was built under the reign of Abbas I of Persia (1571-1629), as a traditional bagh near the village of Fin, located a few kilometres southwest of Kashan.

The garden was developed further during the Safavid dynasty, until Abbas II of Persia (1633-1666). It was highly recognized during the reign of Fat′h Ali Shah Qajar and was considerably expanded.

The garden subsequently suffered from neglect and was damaged several times until, in 1935, it was listed as a national property of Iran. On 2007, 8 September, Bagh-e Fin was submitted to the UNESCO's Tentative List.

Unesco declared the garden a World Heritage Site on July 18, 2012.

Structure
The garden covers 2.3 hectares with a main yard surrounded by ramparts with four circular towers. In keeping with many of the Persian gardens of this era, the Fin Garden employs a great many water features.

These were fed from a spring on a hillside behind the garden, and the water pressure was such that a large number of circulating pools and fountains could be constructed without the need for mechanical pumps. 

The garden contains numerous cypress trees and combines architectural features of the Safavid, Zandiyeh and Qajar periods.

References

External links

Fin Garden at ArchNet
Fin Garden at sartar.ir

World Heritage Sites in Iran
Parks in Iran
Museums in Iran
Architecture in Iran
Persian gardens in Iran
Buildings and structures in Kashan
Tourist attractions in Kashan
1590 establishments in Iran